A little black dress is an evening or cocktail dress.

Little Black Dress may also refer to:

 "Little Black Dress", a song from the 1981 film Shock Treatment
 "Little Black Dress", a 1996 song written by Maurice Seezer and performed by Gavin Friday for his album Shag Tobacco
 "Little Black Dress", a 2006 song written by Mark Avsec and performed by Donnie Iris for his album Ellwood City
 "Little Black Dress" (One Direction song)
 "Gettin' You Home (The Black Dress Song)", a 2009 song performed by Chris Young
 Little Black Dress (film), a 2011 South Korean film
 "Little Black Dress", a 2013 song written by Sara Bareilles from her album The Blessed Unrest

See also
Black Dress, a 1960 painting by the American artist Alex Katz
Black Dress (EP), the seventh extended play by girl group CLC
Blackshirts (disambiguation)